Bjarte Haugsdal (born 9 March 1990) is a Norwegian footballer currently playing for Åsane Fotball  in 1. divisjon. He has previously played for Os, Brann, Løv-Ham and Stabæk.

Career

Early years
Haugsdal grew up in Lysefjorden south of Bergen. In his early years he has played for Lysekloster IL and later Os TF.

SK Brann
Haugsdal signed with Brann in November 2008. He made his debut for Brann in a pre season friendly against Legia Warszawa on 24 January 2009. After playing in Brann 2 for in the most of the 2009 season, Haugsdal debuted in the Norwegian top division on 1 November 2009 against Rosenborg BK when he was used as a substitute.
Haugsdal scored his first official Brann goal on 10 June 2011 in a league match against Sogndal.

Brann did not offer Haugsdal a new contract after the 2011 season. and he joined Stabæk on a free transfer and signed a two-year contract with the club on 16 February 2012

Career statistics

References

External links
 Profile at Brann.no

1990 births
Living people
People from Os, Hordaland
Norwegian footballers
Association football forwards
Association football wingers
SK Brann players
Løv-Ham Fotball players
Stabæk Fotball players
Nest-Sotra Fotball players
Norwegian First Division players
Norwegian Second Division players
Eliteserien players
Sportspeople from Vestland